The Pottier P.60 Minacro is a homebuilt French single seat biplane designed for aerobatics.  It first flew in the early 1990s; about six have been completed.

Design and development

The Minacro is the only biplane amongst Jean Pottier's many light aircraft designs. Like them, it was intended to be home built from his plans.  It is a compact wood and fabric single bay aerobatic biplane, with noticeable stagger. There is a single, wide chord interplane strut on each side, assisted by flying wires and a pair of N-form cabane struts between the upper wing centre-section and the fuselage.

Behind the engine the fuselage is flat-sided, though with rounded decking.  The windscreen of the open cockpit is immediately under the upper wing trailing edge. Both the fin and balanced rudder are broad chord and the latter extends down to the keel so that the elevators, mounted near the top of the fuselage require a cut-out to allow their operation.  The Minacro has a fixed, tailwheel undercarriage with its main wheels, often spatted, on cantilever legs from the lower fuselage just behind the engine.

The first Minacro was built in Austria, making its first flight in about 1991 or 1992 powered by a  Potez 4E-20A engine. Later French-built examples have  Continental C90 or  Continental O-200-A engines.  All of these are air-cooled flat-fours. In 2014 the Austrian Minacro was no longer registered but there were six on the French register, of which at least four, possibly all six, have been completed.

Variants
P.60 Potez 4E-20A engine
P.60A Continental C90 engine

Specifications (P.60A)

References

1990s French sport aircraft
P.060
Biplanes
Aircraft first flown in 1991